Johnson Kuike is a Papua New Guinean rugby league footballer who plays for the Masta Mak Rangers. He played for the Kumuls in the 2010 Four Nations.

References

External links
Team Profiles at RLFourNations.com

Papua New Guinean rugby league players
Papua New Guinean sportsmen
Masta Mark Rangers players
Living people
Papua New Guinea national rugby league team players
Year of birth missing (living people)